The 2009 World Men's Handball Championship (21st tournament) took place in Croatia from 16 January to 1 February, in the cities of Split, Zadar, Osijek, Varaždin, Poreč, Zagreb and Pula. Croatia was selected from a group of four potential hosts which included the Czech Republic, Greece and Romania.

The opening game and ceremony were held in Split, and the final game was played in Zagreb. France won the tournament after defeating Croatia in the final. Poland took the third place after winning over Denmark. Tickets for the tournament went on sale from 15 to 20 November. For the finals, ticket prices started at 700 kuna (c. €95). To promote the tournament, the Croatian National Tourist Board launched a series of presentations in the capitals of 13 participating countries.

During the championship internal criticism arose against Hassan Moustafa, President of the IHF. The secretary general of the IHF, Peter Mühlematter, criticized Moustafa and asked for his demission. Moustafa asked to exclude Mühlematter after his criticism.

Venues
Seven Croatian cities were selected as hosts for the 2009 Championship: Split, Zadar, Osijek, Varaždin, Poreč, Zagreb and Pula. The sites included the new Spaladium Arena in Split and Arena Zagreb, where the final took place.

Qualification

Qualification occurred through the previous years' continental championships or qualifying tournaments:
 Host (1 vacancy)
 World Champion (1 vacancy)
 2008 African Men's Handball Championship (3 vacancies)
 2008 American Handball Championship (3 vacancies)
 2008 Asian Handball Championship (3 vacancies)
 2008 European Men's Handball Championship (3 vacancies)
 2008 European qualifiers play-off (9 vacancies)
 2008 Oceania qualifying tournament (1 vacancy)

European qualifiers play-off

|}

Seeding
The draw for the groups of the preliminary round was held on 21 June 2008, in Zagreb. The draw took place at Zagreb's central Ban Jelačić Square and was hosted by Filip Brkić and Kristina Krepela.

Squads

Each nation had to submit a squad of 16 players.

Referees
On 12 October 2008, the match officials for the tournament were confirmed. But due to injury, the Swedish referee couple Rickard Canbro and Mikael Claesson had to withdraw from the championship, and was replaced by Danish couple Per Olesen and Lars Ejby Pedersen.

Preliminary round

All times are local UTC+1.

Group A

Group B

Group C

Group D

President's Cup

Group I

Group II

Placement games

23rd place game

21st place game

19th place game

17th place game

15th place game

13th place game

Main round

Group I

Group II

Final round

Bracket

Semifinals

Eleventh place game

Ninth place game

Seventh place game

Fifth place game

Third place game

Final

Ranking and statistics

Final ranking

All Star Team
The All Star Team and MVP was announced on 1 February 2009.

Top goalscorers

Source: IHF

Top goalkeepers

Source: IHF

Medalists

IHF broadcasting rights
: RTL
: BHRT (BHT 1)
: ESPN Brasil
: TV 2, TV 2 Sport
: Nile Sport
: Sport+
: RTL, DSF
: Sport TV
: Kuwait Sport Channel 3 and Kuwait Sport +
: Sitel
: TV 2, TV 2 Zebra and TV 2 Sport
: TVP (TVP2 and TVP Sport)
: TVR, Sport 1
: NTV Plus
 (Middle East): Al Jazeera Sports
: RTS (RTS 1)
: RTV Slovenija
: TVE (TVE2, Teledeporte)
: TV 4
: Tunis 7

High Definition
: TV2 Sport HD
: TVP (TVP HD)
: NTV Plus HD
 (Middle East): Al Jazeera Sports HD
: TV4 HD

References

External links

World Handball Championship tournaments
International handball competitions hosted by Croatia
World Mens Handball Championship, 2009
World
January 2009 sports events in Europe
February 2009 sports events in Europe
Sports competitions in Zagreb
Sports competitions in Split, Croatia
2000s in Zagreb
Sport in Varaždin
Sport in Osijek
Sport in Pula
Sport in Zadar
Sports competitions in Poreč
21st century in Split, Croatia